Gorno-Altaysk (historically, pre-1932: Ulala) is the capital town of the Altai Republic, Russia.

The population stands at around 64,000 people as of 2020 with steady growth over the recent years. In the past the town was known as Ulala (up until June 23, 1932) and then Oyrot-Tura (June 23, 1932 - January 7, 1948).

History
The selo of Ulala was established in 1824 when migrants moved to this area from Biysk. When Oirot Autonomous Oblast was established on June 1, 1922, Ulala became its administrative center. On February 27, 1928, Ulala was granted town status and on June 23, 1932, it was renamed Oyrot-Tura. The present name was given to the town on January 7, 1948.

Climate
Gorno-Altaysk has a humid continental climate (Köppen Dfb) characterised by frigid winters and warm to very warm summers. Precipitation is moderate and is much higher in the hotter summer months than in the frigid winter season, when it falls entirely as low-water-content snow.

Administrative and municipal status
Gorno-Altaysk is the capital of the republic. Within the framework of administrative divisions, it is incorporated as Gorno-Altaysk Urban Okrug—an administrative unit with the status equal to that of the districts. As a municipal division, this administrative unit also has urban okrug status.

Transportation
The town is served by the Gorno-Altaysk Airport, with regular flights to the city of Moscow and a few other major Russian cities.

Highway M52 passes through Gorno-Altaysk, connecting it with Novosibirsk in the north and the Mongolian border in the south.

It is located in the city of Biysk.

Culture, sports and education
The town hosts a theater as well as several cinemas, the Gorno-Altaisk State University, and the Anokhin Museum. The mountains located within the town's boundaries are a magnet for skiing as well as backpacking. Several football fields with artificial grass are available to the public for free.

Infrastructure condition 
Only the most vital streets in Gorno-Altaysk are kept in good condition as of 2020. The rivers are safe to swim in and the tap water is safe to drink. Most of the buildings have central heating, usually powered by a gas burning station serving either one or several buildings.

Notes

References

Sources

External links
Official website of Gorno-Altaysk 
Gorno-Altaysk Business Directory jsprav.ru 
Official website of the Gorno-Altaysk State University 

 
Tomsk Governorate
Populated places established in 1824